James Edwin O'Reilly was mayor of Hamilton, Ontario in 1869, and from 1879 to 1881.

External links 
 

Mayors of Hamilton, Ontario